Santa Maria Maddalena, also called the Chiesa della Beata Mattia is a Baroque-style, Roman Catholic church and monastery located on a cul de sac of Via Beata Mattia #39, where it intersects with Via Damiano Chiesa, in Matelica, province of Macerata, region of Marche, Italy.

History
The church is among the oldest in Matelica and construction began in 1225, when a group of Clarissine nuns, including Sister Mattia, established a convent. In 1765, the Sister was beatified, and the church is known for Blessed Mattia. The church has a tall campanile, which served as an overlook for the southern approach to the city. An earthquake in 1740 caused major damage, and in 1750, the church underwent a major reconstruction, including the formulation of a baroque façade, work commissioned by Enrico Mattei and using designs of Gaetano Maggi and Domenico Luigi Valeri.  

The interiors were built still maintaining a screened separation of the cloistered nuns from the lay public. The columns are colored in scagliola. The main altar houses the incorrupt body of the Blessed Mattia in a glass case.

In the monastery, which extends to the right of the facades are housed some of the works of art from the site including a 13th-century painted Crucifix with Madonna and John the Baptist. The church contains a Madonna and Child painted by 13th-century Masters, including Maestro della Culla.

References

Roman Catholic churches in Matelica
Baroque architecture in Marche
Gothic architecture in le Marche
13th-century Roman Catholic church buildings in Italy
Roman Catholic churches completed in 1760